Tubercularia ulmea is a fungal plant pathogen infecting elms.

External links
 USDA ARS Fungal Database

Fungal tree pathogens and diseases
Nectriaceae
Fungi described in 1947